Dimitar Burov (Bulgarian: Димитър Буров; born 31 August 1997) is a Bulgarian professional footballer who plays as a left back for Bulgarian Second League club Montana.

Career

Levski Sofia
Burov started playing football at age of 8 in the Levski-Rakovski Academy. 3 years later, after showing great potential, he  moved to Levski Sofia's main academy.

Slavia Sofia
Burov joined Slavia Sofia's academy in 2015 together with 3 other Levski players.
On 28 May 2016 he made his debut in the A Group for Slavia in a match against Montana.

Loan to Spartak Pleven
On 6 January 2017, Burov joined Spartak Pleven on loan for the rest of the season.

Career statistics

Club

References

External links
 

1997 births
Living people
Bulgarian footballers
Association football defenders
Association football wingers
PFC Slavia Sofia players
PFC Spartak Pleven players
FC CSKA 1948 Sofia players
FC Strumska Slava Radomir players
FC Botev Vratsa players
First Professional Football League (Bulgaria) players
Footballers from Sofia